Cato is the given name of:

 Cato Alexander (1780–1858), American emancipated slave and bar owner, considered by some to be "America's first celebrity bartender"
 Cato Erstad (born 1964), Norwegian footballer
 Cato Maximilian Guldberg (1836–1902), Norwegian mathematician and chemist
 Cato Guhnfeldt (born 1951), Norwegian journalist and non-fiction writer
 Cato Hansen (born 1988), Norwegian footballer
 Cato André Hansen (born 1972), Norwegian football coach and former player
 Cato (spy), Cato Howe, a slave who was an American Patriot spy and courier during the American Revolutionary War
 Cato June (born 1979), American former National Football League player
 Cato T. Laurencin (born 1959), American engineer, physician, scientist, innovator and professor
 Cato Nordbeck, Norwegian former professional racing cyclist, winner of the Norwegian National Road Race Championship in 1965
 Cato Perkins (died 1805), African-American slave who became a missionary to Sierra Leone
 Cato Schiøtz (born 1948), Norwegian barrister and former judge
 Cato Sells (1859–1948), American politician, lawyer and commissioner at the Bureau of Indian Affairs from 1913 to 1921
 Cato Sundberg (born 1981), Norwegian singer, guitarist and songwriter
 Cato Wadel (1936−2011), Norwegian social anthropologist
 Cato West, American military officer and politician, Secretary of the Mississippi Territory and acting territorial governor of Mississippi in 1804 and 1805

Masculine given names
Norwegian masculine given names